Christian Vestergaard (born 26 April 2001) is a professional Danish footballer who plays as a centre-back for Kolding IF, on loan from Danish Superliga club OB.

Career

OB
Born in Assens, Vestergaard started his career at Assens FC, before joining OB at the age of 13.

In October 2019, Vestergaard sat on the bench for two Danish Superliga games, however, without getting his debut for the club. On 23 January 2020, shortly after undergoing cruciate ligament surgery after being injured in the same month, 18-year old Vestergaard signed a new deal with OB, running from 1 July 2021 and 1,5 years onwards, which also secured him a permanent promotion to the first team squad from the summer 2020.

After being out for two out of the last three years, Vestergaard finally got his official debut for OB in a Danish Cup game against FC Midtjylland, playing the whole game. Vestergaard also got his Danish Superliga debut on 24 May 2021 against AC Horsens.

On 31 May 2021, Vestergaard signed a contract extension with OB until July 2024. To gain some experience, it was confirmed on 24 June 2022, that Vestergaard would spend the upcoming 2022-23 season on loan at Danish 2nd Division club Kolding IF.

References

External links

Christian Vestergaard at DBU

2001 births
Living people
Danish men's footballers
Association football defenders
Denmark youth international footballers
Danish Superliga players
Odense Boldklub players
Kolding IF players